Gunnison is a home rule municipality that is the county seat and the most populous municipality of Gunnison County, Colorado. The city population was 6,560 at the 2020 United States Census. Gunnison was named in honor of John W. Gunnison, a United States Army officer who surveyed for a transcontinental railroad in 1853.

History 

The City of Gunnison got its name from the first known European-American explorer of the area, John W. Gunnison. He was searching for a route for the transcontinental railroad in 1853 and only stayed for three days before traveling west to Utah. Gunnison saw its first population increase in the 1870s, due to the mining surge throughout the state. The railroad arrived soon after in 1880 to appreciative miners, ranchers, and farmers.

In the early 1800s, the groups moving into the Gunnison area were mainly fur trappers and mountain men, trying to make a living for themselves in the rocky mountain terrain. But a drop in fur prices in the 1840s essentially cut out the need for their jobs.

The late 1850s saw the start of people joining the hunt for gold in Gunnison county. Miners were in search of placer gold, but with the growing numbers of white men in the area, this brought conflict between the Ute tribes still around the county. At least several miners were killed by these tribes and this caused some of the miners to flee the area, caring more for their lives than potential gold bonanzas.

With the mining boom, Gunnison began to see an increase of people around the 1870s. Along with the miners coming in, ranchers and farmers were among the others that led to the Ute people becoming forced out of the area. The mining camps in Gunnison and around the county reportedly produced about 130,000 ounces of gold from the beginning of the gold rush through 1959. At the start this was mostly from placer deposits, but the largest amounts were from a by-product of silver-lead ore. The largest deposits were found along the Taylor River, as well as the Tincup and the Washington Gulch districts.

Before the railroad reached Gunnison in 1880, there was a debate as to which railroad line would claim the town as their territory. The D&RG and DSP&P were both battling for control over the area. This split the town into two sides, both disagreeing as to where the railroad depots should be placed in town. The "old" and "new" sides of town ended up agreeing to disagree and were happy to have any railroad come through town. Both lines ended up coming through town anyway, although the DSP&P shortly discontinued service to Gunnison. The D&RG was later reorganized as the D&RGW railroad and was a prominent line to Gunnison for about seventy years; it served as the primary means of transportation for the townspeople into the 1950s.

Also in 1880, the cattle industry in Gunnison was established. Realizing the poor conditions for farming (with only about eleven inches of rainfall annually and the short growing season due to the high elevation and alpine environment) the local farmers turned to ranching and began breeding cattle. To do this effectively, they had to clear and level fields for grazing purposes. Irrigation ditches also had to be cut into the ground to properly irrigate the fields in order to grow hay for the horses and cattle. Many of these practices are still in use, which can be seen while driving through and around the town to the various ranches that are still in operation.

John and William Outcalt were among the earliest settlers of Gunnison. They started their own ranch just north of town along the southeast bank of the Gunnison river. The brothers hailed from New Jersey, but decided to make the trip west for the sake of adventure and the prospect of making money. The eldest brother, John, built the irrigation system for their ranch and quickly began growing hay and other various grains. When the railroad came through town, he convinced them to expand more and ended up paying for and building the rail that ran through his property. Naming this stop Hay Spur, they produced enough hay to ship out over 800 carloads each year, which mainly headed north to the settlers of which is now the town of Crested Butte, helping feed their mules. Along with the hay, carloads of potatoes and other vegetables from the Gunnison area were being sent to Crested Butte to supply the miners with food and also to support their animals.
John Outcalt is also known to be one of the most famous men in the town. He helped build the Paragon School, which is still standing today in the Gunnison Pioneer Society museum on the east end of town. Originally a shipbuilder and carpenter in New Jersey, he incorporated his skills in the building of the school which is why it is still standing today. John was also praised by the local natives; when he first arrived in town he worked as a carpenter on the Los Pinos Indian reservation, and was considered the most trusted White man in the area. This helped in the long run because, according to legend, they saved his life on numerous occasions.

Gunnison residents isolated themselves from the surrounding area during the Spanish Influenza epidemic for two months at the end of 1918. All highways were barricaded near the county lines. Train conductors warned all passengers that if they stepped outside of the train in Gunnison, they would be arrested and quarantined for five days. This served as partial inspiration for the novel The Last Town on Earth (2006) by Thomas Mullen. The isolation was ultimately unsuccessful, as townspeople became restless after a few months, and the isolation was lifted in February 1919 only to have the flu arrive a month later, killing several.

Geography

Gunnison is near Blue Mesa Reservoir. Primary access to Gunnison is from Salida to the east via Monarch Pass or from Montrose, Colorado, to the west via Cerro Summit on U.S. Highway 50. U.S. Highway 50 is the main east-west thoroughfare through the town. There are numerous other ways to get to Gunnison, some of which are subject to seasonal closures (Kebler Pass, Cottonwood Pass). At the 2010 Census there was a population of 15,324 within the county.

Climate
Gunnison is located at the bottom of a valley. Due to its location in the Rocky Mountains, cold air in all the valleys settles into Gunnison at night, making it one of the coldest places in winter in the United States, especially when snowpack is present.

Early fall and late spring snows are not uncommon, and snow can remain on the ground in town from as early as November to as late as April. Surrounding mountains experience very heavy snowfall with longer periods of snow on the ground. Many locations average  of snow annually. The snow is welcome to the area, as it is beneficial to water supplies and local ski resorts.

According to the Köppen Climate Classification system, Gunnison has a warm-summer humid continental climate, abbreviated "Dfb" on climate maps.

Demographics

As of the census of 2010, there were 5,854 people, 2,318 households, and 991 families residing in the city. The racial makeup of the city was 86.9% White, 0.6% African American, 2.4% Native American, 0.6% Asian, 0% Pacific Islander, 6.6% from other races, and 2.8% from two or more races. Hispanic or Latino of any race were 14.2% of the population.

There were 2,318 households, out of which 20.6% had children under the age of 18 living with them, 30.6% were married couples living together, 7.1% had a female householder with no husband present, and 57.2% were non-families. 34.9% of all households were made up of individuals, and 7.2% had someone living alone who was 65 years of age or older.  The average household size was 2.2 and the average family size was 2.9.

In the city, the population breakdown was 26.1% under the age of 19, 23.4% from 20 to 24, 26.1% from 25 to 44, 16.8 from 45 to 64, and 7.6% who were 65 years of age or older.  The median age was 25.2 years. For every 100 females, there were 120.1 males.  For every 100 females age 18 and over, there were 128 males.

The median income for a household in the city was $39,181, and the median income for a family was $59,836. Males had a median income of $35,818 versus $28,476 for females. The per capita income for the city was $17,776.  18.9% of families and 30.6% of the population were below the poverty line, including 42.2% of those under age 18 and 16.6% of those age 65 or over.

Education

Gunnison is home to Western Colorado University which received its third renaming since its beginnings from an approval of Governor John Wright Hickenlooper on August 1, 2012. The college was founded as The Colorado State Normal School for Children by a bill signed on April 16, 1901, by Governor James B. Orman. In 1923, the college's name was changed to Western State College of Colorado because its role expanded from a teaching institution to a liberal arts college. Historical papers in the Leslie Savage Library on campus state that the school was the first liberal arts college on the Western Slope of Colorado.

The Gunnison Valley is also served by the Gunnison Watershed RE1J School District which includes Public and Non Public schools. The public schools in the RE1J school district are located in Crested Butte and Gunnison; Marble Charter School is located in the Statutory Town of Marble in northwest Gunnison County. Public Schools in Gunnison Watershed RE1J School District:  
Gunnison Elementary School
Gunnison Kindergarten at Lake School
Gunnison Middle School
Gunnison High School
Crested Butte Community School
Gunnison Pre-School
Marble Charter School

The law concerning non public schools, 22-33-104, C.R.S., requires that a sequential program of instruction be provided by an independent or parochial school. Such program shall include, but not be limited to, communication skills of reading, writing, and speaking, mathematics, history, civics, literature, and science. Some of the non-public schools in Gunnison County adhering to these C.R.S. are:
Little Red Schoolhouse
Paradise Place
Stepping Stones Children Center
Tenderfoot CFDC

Media
Gunnison's newspaper, Gunnison Country Times, is published weekly. There are also various radio stations that serve the area, including KWSB-FM (91.1), which is affiliated with Western Colorado University. KBUT of Crested Butte also simulcasts NPR broadcasts at 90.3 FM.

In film
The 1902 silent film short The Girls in the Overalls directed by Harry Buckwalter is set on the Vidal Ranch in Gunnison.

Gunnison County is the setting of the science fiction film Aliens vs. Predator: Requiem, although the film was actually shot in the towns of Port Coquitlam and Port Moody, British Columbia.

On television
Gunnison is the setting of the 1960–1961 syndicated western television series Two Faces West.

Gunnison is the birthplace of the American actress Donna Anderson, a supporting cast member of the ABC western series, The Travels of Jaimie McPheeters (1963–1964).

Gunnison is the setting for Season 11, Episode 19 of the CW series Supernatural entitled "The Chitters".

In literature
In 2009, Gunnison appeared as a launch site and mission control facility in Stephen Baxter's post-apocalyptic science fiction novel Ark.

Transportation

The Gunnison–Crested Butte Regional Airport serves the valley and nearby Crested Butte with both commercial airline and general aviation flights. 
Gunnison Valley Rural Transportation Authority (RTA) operates bus service between Gunnison and Crested Butte serving Western Colorado University and Crested Butte Mountain Resort. Gunnison is part of the statewide Bustang system, which connects the town to Denver.

The League of American Bicyclists has awarded Gunnison the silver level in bicycle friendliness.

Activities

Winter
Winter activities for Gunnison include skiing at Crested Butte Mountain Resort, skiing at Monarch Ski Area, snowmobiling, cross country skiing, back country skiing, ice fishing, ice skating, hunting, and snowshoeing.

Summer
Activities during the summer in Gunnison include fishing on the Gunnison River, Tomichi Creek and Blue Mesa Reservoir. Hiking in any of the numerous areas within a short distance of town like Curecanti National Recreation Area, Tomichi State Wildlife Area, Sapinero State Wildlife Area, McIntosh State Wildlife Area. Biking activities include road biking and mountain biking; Hartman Rocks has many bike trails for mountain biking as well as motorcross and rock climbing. One rafting practice is to rent a raft in Almont and drift  down the Gunnison River to the town of Gunnison. Below the Hwy 50 bridge on the Gunnison river is the whitewater park. The Gunnison Ranger District Office located at 216 North Colorado Street offers maps and information about details particular to vehicle access, private, BLM, federal and state properties, trails, and other areas of interest.<ref>Another good map depicting seasonal designation table (road use) is the Motor Vehicle Travel Map – Gunnison Basin Public Lands – Colorado 2011, published by United States Department of Interior and United States Department of Agriculture</ref>

Gunnison also hosts festivals and farmers markets during the summer months.

Cattlemen's Days
A rodeo in Colorado takes place over a 10-day period in July featuring PRCA Rodeo activities as well as family-based activities. Cattlemen’s Days celebrated its 112th year of rich western heritage in a first class and nationally recognized rodeo event for the year 2012. In 2011, this rodeo was nominated as one of the five finalists for Mid-sized rodeo of the year. It continues to be a leader in PCRA rodeos in fund-raising for breast cancer with their Tough enough to wear pink campaign. Cattlemen's Days also offers scholarships to support and further the education of 4-H and FFA exhibitors.

Notable people

 Donna Anderson (born 1939), actress
 Susan DeMattei (born 1962), U.S. Olympic cyclist
 Rebecca Dussault (born 1980), U.S. Olympic cross country skiing
 Elva Dryer (born 1971), U.S. Olympic long-distance runner
 Patricia Elliott (1938–2015), actress
 Dan Gibbs (born 1976), Colorado state legislator
 Herschel M. Hogg (1853–1934), U.S. Representative from Colorado
 Sally Jacobsen (c. 1947–2017), journalist, first woman to serve as international editor of the Associated Press''
 Ila Mae McAfee (1897–1995), painter, illustrator
 Aaron Simpson (born 1974), mixed martial arts fighter

See also

Colorado
Bibliography of Colorado
Index of Colorado-related articles
Outline of Colorado
List of counties in Colorado
List of municipalities in Colorado
List of places in Colorado
Curecanti National Recreation Area
Old Spanish National Historic Trail

References

External links

City of Gunnison website
CDOT map of the City of Gunnison
Gunnison-Crested Butte Tourism
Gunnison County Historic Preservation Commission

Cities in Gunnison County, Colorado
Cities in Colorado
Colorado Western Slope
County seats in Colorado